In geometry, the Feuerbach hyperbola is a rectangular hyperbola passing through important triangle centers such as the Orthocenter, Gergonne point, Nagel point and Shiffler point. The center of the hyperbola is the Feuerbach point, the point of tangency of the incircle and the nine-point circle.

Equation 

Properties 

Like other rectangular hyperbolas, the orthocenter of any three points on the curve lies on the hyperbola. So, the orthocenter of the triangle  lies on the curve.

Isogonal conjugate of OI 
This fact leads to a few interesting properties. Specifically all the points lying on the line  have their isogonal conjugates lying on the hyperbola. The Nagel point lies on the curve since its isogonal conjugate is the point of concurrency of the lines joining the vertices and the opposite Mixtilinear incircle touchpoints, also the in-similitude of the incircle and the circumcircle. Similarly, the Gergonne point lies on the curve since its isogonal conjugate is the ex-similitude of the incircle and the circumcircle.

The pedal circle of any point on the hyperbola passes through the Feuerbach point, the center of the hyperbola.

Kariya's theorem 

Given a triangle , let  be the touchpoints of the incircle  with the sides of the triangle opposite to vertices  respectively. Let  be points lying on the lines  such that . Then, the lines  are concurrent at a point lying on the Feuerbach hyperbola.

The Kariya's theorem has a long history. It was proved independently by Auguste Boutin and  V. Retali., but it became famous only after Kariya's paper. Around that time, many generalizations of this result were given. Kariya's theorem can be used for the construction of the Feuerbach hyperbola.

Both Lemoine's theorem and Kariya's theorem are a special case of Jacobi's theorem.

See also

Other rectangular hyperbolas 

 Kiepert hyperbola, the unique conic which passes through a triangle's three vertices, its centroid, and its orthocenter
 Jeřábek hyperbola, a rectangular hyperbola centered on a triangle's nine-point circle and passing through the triangle's three vertices as well as its circumcenter, orthocenter, and various other notable centers

References

Further reading 

 Feuerbach Hyperbola, MathWorld

Triangle geometry